United Nations Security Council resolution 1121, adopted unanimously on 22 July 1997, after recalling that the maintenance of international peace and security was one of the main purposes of the United Nations, the council established the Dag Hammarskjöld Medal, named after the second Secretary-General Dag Hammarskjöld, awarded posthumously to United Nations peacekeepers.

The council recalled that the 1988 Nobel Peace Prize was awarded to United Nations peacekeepers. It recognised that over 1,500 individuals from 85 countries had died in peacekeeping operations and that the Dag Hammarskjöld Medal would serve as a tribute to their sacrifice. The Secretary-General Kofi Annan was requested to establish criteria and procedures for the awarding of the medal, and other countries were requested to co-operate with its presentation.

See also
 International Day of United Nations Peacekeepers
 List of United Nations peacekeeping missions
 List of United Nations Security Council Resolutions 1101 to 1200 (1997–1998)
 United Nations Security Council Resolution 868

References

External links
 
Text of the Resolution at undocs.org

 1121
United Nations peacekeeping
July 1997 events
United Nations Security Council resolutions concerning United Nations peacekeeping